Clackamas Middle College (CMC) is a public charter school in Happy Valley, Oregon, United States.

Academics
Clackamas Middle College is a public charter high school sponsored by North Clackamas School District. 

Clackamas Middle College enrolls students from all over the Portland Metro Area. Our students come from varied socio-economic and academic backgrounds with many different languages spoken. Our students are enrolled within three of our programs aimed at postsecondary readiness.

References

High schools in Clackamas County, Oregon
Charter schools in Oregon
Public middle schools in Oregon
Public high schools in Oregon